Mykyta Serhiyovych Bezuhlyi (born 1 August 1995) is a Ukrainian professional footballer who plays as a centre-back for Metalist 1925 Kharkiv.

References

External links
 
 

1995 births
Living people
People from Volnovakha
Ukrainian footballers
Association football defenders
FC Shakhtar Donetsk players
FC Obolon-Brovar Kyiv players
FC Metalist 1925 Kharkiv players
Ukrainian Premier League players
Ukrainian First League players
Ukraine youth international footballers
Ukraine student international footballers
Sportspeople from Donetsk Oblast